The Bonanno crime family (pronounced ) is an Italian-American Mafia crime family and one of the "Five Families" that dominate organized crime activities in New York City, and in the United States, as part of the criminal phenomenon known as the American Mafia.

The family was known as the Maranzano crime family until its founder Salvatore Maranzano was murdered in 1931. Joseph Bonanno was awarded most of Maranzano's operations when Charles "Lucky" Luciano oversaw the  creation of the Commission to divide up criminal enterprises in New York City among the Five Families. Under the leadership of Bonanno between the 1930s and 1960s, the family was one of the most powerful in the country.

However, in the early 1960s, Bonanno attempted to overthrow several leaders of the Commission, but failed. Bonanno disappeared from 1964 to 1966, triggering an intra-family war colloquially referred to as the "Banana War" that lasted until 1968, when Bonanno retired to Arizona.

Between 1976 and 1981, the family was infiltrated by an FBI agent calling himself Donnie Brasco, becoming the first of the New York families to be kicked off the Commission. The family only recovered in the 1990s under Joseph Massino and, by the dawn of the new millennium, was not only back on the Commission, but also was the most powerful family in New York.

However, in the early 2000s, a rash of convictions culminated in Massino himself becoming a government informant, the first boss of one of the Five Families in New York City to do so. The Bonanno family was seen as the most brutal of the Five Families during the 20th century.

History

Sicilian origins 
The origins of the Bonanno crime family can be traced back to the town of Castellammare del Golfo located in the Province of Trapani, Sicily, their boss Giuseppe "Peppe" Bonanno, and his older brother and advisor, Stefano. The clan's strongest ally was the leader of the Magaddino Clan Stefano Magaddino, the brother of Joseph's maternal grandmother. During the 1900s, the two clans feuded with Felice Buccellato, the boss of the Buccellato Clan.

In 1902, Magaddino arrived in New York and became a powerful member of the Castellammarese clan. After the murders of Stefano and Giuseppe, their younger brother, Salvatore, took revenge by killing members of the Buccellatos.

In 1903, Salvatore married Catherine Bonventre and on January 18, 1905, she gave birth to Joseph Bonanno. Three years later Salvatore moved his family to New York City, and began establishing dominance and control in the Castellammarese community of Williamsburg, Brooklyn. While operating in Brooklyn, the Castellammarese leaders were able to secure the criminal organization's future.

In 1911, Salvatore returned to Sicily, where he died of a heart attack in 1915. In 1921, Magaddino fled to Buffalo, New York to avoid murder charges and the Castellammarese clan was taken over by Nicolo "Cola" Schirò.

Castellammarese War 

In 1930, violence broke out between a faction led by Giuseppe "Joe the Boss" Masseria and members of the Castellammareses over the theft of Masseria's bootleg liquor. This soon developed into a full out war known as the Castellammarese War. At the time, the Castellammareses were led by Nicolo "Cola" Schirò, who tried to work with Masseria. Schirò was replaced by Salvatore Maranzano, who wanted to take control over New York's underworld. Under Maranzano's leadership, the bloodshed continued.

The Castellammarese faction was more organized and unified than the Masseria Clan. Maranzano's allies were Buffalo family boss Stefano Magaddino, Detroit family boss Gaspar Milazzo and Philadelphia family boss Salvatore Sabella, all Castellammarese. The family included mobsters Joseph Bonanno, Carmine Galante, and Gaspar DiGregorio. Maranzano was also close to Joseph Profaci, future boss of the New York Profaci family. Finally, they established a secret alliance with the Bronx Reina family boss Gaetano Reina, a nominal Masseria ally.

After Reina's murder on February 26, 1930, members of the Masseria faction began to defect to Maranzano. By 1931, momentum had shifted to the Castellammarese faction. That spring, a group of younger Mafiosi from both camps, known as the "Young Turks", decided to switch to Maranzano and end the war. This group included future mob bosses Charles "Lucky" Luciano, Vito Genovese, Frank Costello, Tommy Lucchese, Albert Anastasia and Joe Adonis. As leader of the Young Turks, Luciano concluded a secret deal with Maranzano and promised to kill Masseria. The war finally came to end when Masseria was killed on April 15, 1931.

Maranzano's murder and the Commission 

After Masseria's death, Maranzano outlined a peace plan to all the Sicilian and Italian Mafia leaders in the United States. There would be 24 organizations (to be known as "families") throughout the United States, each of which would elect its own boss. In New York City, Maranzano established five Cosa Nostra families: the Luciano family under Lucky Luciano, the Mangano family under Vincent Mangano, the Gagliano family under Tommy Gagliano, the Profaci family under Joseph Profaci, and the Maranzano crime family under himself. Maranzano created an additional post for himself, that of capo di tutti capi, or boss of bosses.

Although Maranzano was more forward-looking than Masseria, at core he was still a "Mustache Pete". It did not take long for Maranzano and Luciano to come into conflict: Luciano was not pleased that Maranzano had reneged on his promise of equality, and soon came to believe he was even more hidebound and greedy than Masseria had been. At the same time, Maranzano had grown uncomfortable with Luciano's ambitions and growing power and secretly plotted to have him killed. When Tommy Lucchese alerted Luciano that he and Vito Genovese had been marked for death, Luciano felt he had to strike first.

On September 10, 1931, gangsters hired by Luciano, who were not known to Maranzano or his men, murdered Maranzano in his office. Luciano had become the dominant crime boss in America and replaced the "boss of bosses" title with The Commission to regulate the Mafia's national affairs and mediate disputes between families. He also awarded Joseph Bonanno leadership of the Maranzano family.

The Bonanno era 
After Maranzano's death, Joseph Bonanno was awarded most of Maranzano's operations. At 26 years old, Bonanno was the youngest Mafia leader in the nation.

Years later, Bonanno claimed not to have known about the plot to eliminate Maranzano, and only learned later that Maranzano had planned to kill Luciano due to a falling-out over influence in the Garment District. By Bonanno's account, he believed a renewed war with Luciano would serve no purpose, since Luciano only wanted to run his own rackets. However, mob expert Anthony Bruno has argued that it was very unlikely that Luciano would have allowed him to live had he still backed Maranzano.

Bonanno directed his family into illegal gambling, loansharking, and narcotics. The family also built significant criminal interests in California and Arizona. With the support of Buffalo crime family boss Stefano Magaddino, Bonanno also expanded into Canada.

Like Maranzano before him, Joseph Bonanno embraced the Old World Mafia traditions of "honor", "tradition", "respect" and "dignity" as principles for ruling his family. He was more steeped in these traditions than other mobsters of his generation. For instance, he considered himself the "Father" of his family, as Maranzano had before him. The Bonanno family was considered the closest knit of the Five Families because Joseph tried to restrict membership to Castellammarese Sicilians. He strongly believed that blood relations and a strict Sicilian upbringing were the only way to uphold the traditional values of the Mafia.

Over the years, Joseph became a powerful member of the Commission, owing to his close relationship with fellow boss Joe Profaci. The bond between the two became even stronger when Joseph's son Salvatore "Bill" Bonanno married Profaci's niece Rosalie in 1956. The Bonanno-Profaci alliance deterred the other three families from trying to move in on their rackets.

The stable power relationship between the families collapsed with the death of Profaci in 1962. Joseph Bonanno was now threatened by an alliance of Tommy Lucchese and new boss Carlo Gambino, and rising discontent within his own family. Many of the family members had begun to complain that Joseph spent too much time at his second home in Tucson, Arizona.

In 1963, Bonanno made plans to assassinate several rivals on the Commission—bosses Tommy Lucchese, Carlo Gambino, and Stefano Magaddino, as well as Frank DeSimone. Bonanno sought and got the support of Profaci's successor, Joseph Magliocco.  Not only was Magliocco bitter from being denied a seat on the Commission, but Bonanno and Profaci had been close allies for over 30 years prior to Profaci's death. Bonanno's audacious goal was to take over the Commission and make Magliocco his right-hand man.

Magliocco was assigned the task of killing Lucchese and Gambino and gave the contract to one of his top hit men, Joseph Colombo. However, the opportunistic Colombo revealed the plot to its targets. The other bosses quickly realized that Magliocco could not have planned this himself. Knowing how close Bonanno was with Magliocco (and before him, Profaci), as well as their close ties through marriages, the other bosses concluded Bonanno was the real mastermind.

The Commission summoned Bonanno and Magliocco to explain themselves. Fearing for his life, Bonanno went into hiding in Montreal, leaving Magliocco to deal with the Commission. Badly shaken and in failing health, Magliocco confessed his role in the plot. The Commission spared Magliocco's life, but forced him to retire as Profaci family boss and pay a $50,000 fine.  As a reward for turning on his boss, Colombo was awarded the Profaci family.

In October 1964, Bonanno returned to Manhattan, but on October 21, 1964, the day he was scheduled to testify before a grand jury, Bonanno was allegedly kidnapped by Magaddino's men as he entered the apartment house on Park Avenue and East 36th Street where one of his lawyers lived. FBI recordings of New Jersey boss Sam "the Plumber" Decavalcante revealed that the other bosses were taken by surprise when Bonanno disappeared, and other FBI recordings captured angry Bonanno soldiers saying, "That son-of-a-bitch took off and left us here alone."

The "Banana War" 
During Bonanno's two-year absence, Gaspar DiGregorio took advantage of family discontent over Bill's role to claim family leadership. The Mafia Commission named DiGregorio as Bonanno family boss and the DiGregorio revolt led to four years of strife in the Bonanno family, labeled by the media as the "Banana War". This led to a divide in the family between loyalists to Bill and loyalists to DiGregorio.

In early 1966, DiGregorio allegedly contacted Bill about having a peace meeting. Bill agreed and suggested his grand-uncle's house on Troutman Street in Brooklyn as a meeting site. On January 28, 1966, as Bill and his loyalists approached the house, they were met with gunfire. No one was wounded during this confrontation.

Joe Bonanno reappeared on May 17, 1966, at Foley Square. In 1968, DiGregorio was wounded by machine gun fire and later suffered a heart attack. The Commission eventually became dissatisfied with DiGregorio's efforts at quelling the family rebellion, dropped DiGregorio, and swung their support to Paul Sciacca. In 1968, after a heart attack, Joe Bonanno ended the family warfare by agreeing to retire as boss and move to Arizona. As part of this peace agreement, Bill also resigned as consigliere and moved out of New York with his father.

Rastelli regime 

Sciacca only held the position of boss for a few years, giving way to Natale "Joe Diamonds" Evola, a Bonanno loyalist, in 1971. Evola's leadership was also short-lived, and his death in 1973, from natural causes, brought Philip "Rusty" Rastelli to the head position. On February 23, 1974, at a meeting at the Americana Hotel in Manhattan, the Commission named Rastelli as boss.

On March 6, 1975, Rastelli was indicted on racketeering charges involving extortion. Nine years earlier, Rastelli had established a trade association of lunch wagon operators and taken control of the industry. Any operator who refused to join the Association and pay its stiff fees faced vandalism and physical assault. On April 23, 1976, Rastelli was convicted of extortion in United States District Court for the Eastern District of New York. On August 27, 1976, Rastelli was sentenced to 10 years in prison, to be served consecutively after a four-year state sentence for conspiracy, criminal contempt of court, and usury.

In Rastelli's absence, Galante seized control of the Bonannos as unofficial acting boss. The New York crime families were alarmed at Galante's brazen attempt at taking over the narcotics market. Genovese crime family boss Frank Tieri began contacting Cosa Nostra leaders to build a consensus for Galante's murder, even obtaining approval from the retired Joseph Bonanno.

In 1979, they received a boost when Rastelli and Joseph Massino sought Commission approval to kill Galante; the request was granted. On July 12, 1979, Galante was shot dead by three men at a restaurant in the Bushwick area of Brooklyn.

Donnie Brasco and the three capos murder 

Joseph Pistone, alias Donnie Brasco, was an undercover FBI agent tasked with infiltrating the Bonanno family. After months of planning, in September 1976, Pistone started his undercover operation—an operation that was initially intended to last for around six months, but which turned into several years.

Pistone first spent six months in the Colombo family before he shifted to the Bonanno family by developing a relationship with Anthony Mirra. When Mirra was sent to prison, Pistone was tutored in the ways of the Mafia by Bonanno soldier Benjamin "Lefty" Ruggiero, whose captain was Mike "Mimi" Sabella. After the murder of Galante, Pistone reported to captain Dominick "Sonny Black" Napolitano.

Following the Galante hit, Massino began jockeying for power with Napolitano. Both men were themselves threatened by another faction seeking to depose the absentee boss led by capos Alphonse "Sonny Red" Indelicato, Dominick "Big Trin" Trincera and Philip Giaccone. The Commission initially tried to maintain neutrality, but in 1981, Massino got word from his informants that the three capos were stocking up on automatic weapons and planning to kill the Rastelli loyalists within the Bonanno family to take complete control. Massino turned to Colombo crime family boss Carmine Persico and Gambino boss Paul Castellano for advice; they told him to act immediately.

Massino, Napolitano and Gerlando Sciascia, a Sicilian-born capo linked to the Montreal Rizzuto crime family, arranged a meeting at a Brooklyn social club with the three capos for May 5, 1981. They had four gunmen, including Vitale and Bonanno-affiliated Montreal boss Vito Rizzuto, hiding in a closet to ambush them. When Trinchera, Giaccone and Indelicato arrived with Frank "Curly" Lino to meet Massino, they were shot to death, with Massino himself stopping Indelicato from escaping. Lino escaped unscathed by running out the door. The hit further improved Massino's prestige, but was marred by both Lino's escape and the discovery of Indelicato's body on May 28.

Massino quickly won Lino over to his side, but Indelicato's son, Anthony "Bruno" Indelicato, vowed revenge. Napolitano assigned the associate he knew as Donnie Brasco, whom he hoped to make a made man, to kill Indelicato. However, Brasco's operation was ended on July 26, 1981. Pistone's undercover work led to over 200 indictments and over 100 convictions of Mafia members.

On August 17, 1981, Napolitano was shot and killed in a basement by Ronald Filocomo and Lino as punishment for admitting Pistone into his crew. On August 29, 1981, the FBI intercepted and arrested Ruggiero. Ruggiero received 15 years under the RICO act. In February 1982, Anthony Mirra, the man who had brought Pistone to the family, was also killed.

In 1985, Rastelli was indicted along with other Cosa Nostra leaders in the Mafia Commission Trial, however, when Rastelli was indicted on separate labor racketeering charges, prosecutors decided to remove him from the Commission trial. Having previously lost their seat on the Commission due to the Brasco infiltration, the Bonanno family suffered less exposure than the other families in this case.

Under Massino's command 
Rastelli died on June 24, 1991. Soon afterward, Massino's brother-in-law, Salvatore Vitale, convened a meeting of the family's capos where Massino was acclaimed as boss. Vitale and other capos had pressed Massino to become boss since the late 1980s. However, Massino was reluctant to take this step as long as Rastelli was alive, citing long-standing Mafia tradition that a boss retains his title until he retires or dies. He did, however, designate Vitale as his messenger while he was incarcerated, and ordered Vitale to "make me boss" as soon as Rastelli died.

Massino was 49 years old at the time he formally became boss, and knew he potentially had a long reign ahead of him if he could avoid the pitfalls that landed other bosses in prison. With this in mind, Massino adopted a more secretive way of doing business than had been the case for mafiosi during much of the 20th century. He shut down the family's social clubs, believing they were too easy to bug. He all but ended joint rackets with other families, believing that there was too much risk in depending on other families. He also streamlined the family's chain of command, assigning a group of capos to oversee a particular enterprise and report to Vitale, whom he named underboss. When Massino was granted supervised release in 1992, he retained Vitale as his messenger until 1995 since Massino was not allowed to associate with known mafiosi. However, since Vitale had never been convicted of a mob-related crime, the FBI had no reason to be suspicious of the two brothers-in-law meeting together.

Massino was angered by family namesake Bonanno's tell-all book, A Man of Honor, considering it a gross violation of the code of omertà. To that end, he changed the family's name to "the Massino family." At the same time, he barred family members from speaking his name. Instead, they were to point to their ears when referring to him—a nod to how Genovese boss Vincent Gigante told his men to point to their chins rather than use his name. Remembering how close Pistone/Brasco had come to actually being made, Massino required any prospective soldier to be "on record" with a made man for at least eight years before becoming made himself. He also strongly encouraged his men to volunteer their sons for membership, believing that they would be less likely to turn informer and be more loyal. However, the family already had a reputation for loyalty. It had been the only family in the modern history of the New York Mafia (i. e., since the Castellammarese War) to have never had a made man turn informant or government witness. Massino used this as a point of pride to rally his crime family.

Within a few years, the Bonannos had regained their Commission seat with Gotti's help. By 1998, a rash of convictions in other families left Massino as the only full-fledged New York boss who was not in prison. The FBI reckoned him as the most powerful boss in the nation. His stature put him in a position to set general policies for the entire New York Mafia.

Downfall and Massino turns state's evidence

The family managed to avoid being ensnared by the FBI until 2000, when a pair of forensic accountants who normally worked on financial fraud cases discovered that Barry Weinberg, a businessman who had partnered with capo Richard Cantarella in several parking lots, had failed to report millions of dollars worth of income over a decade. Told he faced a long prison term unless he wore a wire and incriminated his Bonanno partners, Weinberg agreed to cooperate. One of Weinberg's other partners, Augustino Scozzari, also agreed to cooperate. Between them, Weinberg and Scozzari captured hundreds of incriminating statements from Cantarella and his crew.

In October 2002, armed with this evidence, the government won a 24-count RICO indictment against 21 Bonanno soldiers and associates. The biggest names on the indictment were Cantarella—who was serving as acting underboss while Vitale was awaiting sentencing for loansharking and money laundering—and capo Frank Coppa. Already serving time for fraud, Coppa agreed to turn informer rather than face the prospect of an additional conviction that would effectively send him to prison for life. He was the first made man in the Bonanno family's history to turn informer. He was followed shortly afterward by acting underboss Cantarella, a participant in the Mirra murder, who was facing racketeering and murder charges and whom Coppa had implicated in the Perrino murder along with Vitale. A third, Joseph D'Amico, subsequently turned state's evidence with the knowledge that Cantarella could implicate him in murder as well. All of these defections left Massino, at last, vulnerable to serious charges.

On January 9, 2003, Massino was arrested and indicted, alongside Vitale, Frank Lino and capo Daniel Mongelli, in a comprehensive racketeering indictment. The charges against Massino himself included ordering the 1981 murder of Napolitano. Massino was denied bail, and Vincent Basciano took over as acting boss in his absence. Massino hired David Breitbart, an attorney he had originally wanted to represent him in his 1987 trial, for his defense.

Three more Bonanno made men would choose to cooperate before Massino came to trial. The first was James Tartaglione; anticipating he would shortly be indicted as well he went to the FBI and agreed to wear a wire while he remained free. The second was Salvatore Vitale. In custody, Massino again put out the word, to a receptive Bonanno family, that he wanted Vitale killed. After learning of Massino's earlier plans to kill his brother-in-law from Coppa and Cantarella, prosecutors informed Vitale. Vitale was already dissatisfied by the lack of support he and his family received from Massino after his arrest. On the day he was arraigned with Massino, Vitale decided to flip as soon as it was safe to do so; he formally reached a deal with prosecutors in February. He was followed in short order by Lino, knowing Vitale could implicate him in murder as well. Also flipping was longtime Bonanno associate Duane Leisenheimer, concerned for his safety after an investigator for Massino's defense team visited to find out if he intended to flip.

By the time the trial started, Massino faced 11 RICO counts for seven murders (due to the prospect of prosecutors seeking the death penalty for the Sciascia murder, that case was severed to be tried separately), arson, extortion, loansharking, illegal gambling, and money laundering. By this time, Time magazine had dubbed Massino as "the Last Don", in reference to his status as the only New York boss not serving a prison sentence at that point. The name stuck.

After deliberating for five days, the jury found Massino guilty of all eleven counts on July 30, 2004. His sentencing was initially scheduled for October 12, and he was expected to receive a sentence of life imprisonment with no possibility of parole. The jury also approved the prosecutors' recommended $10 million forfeiture of the proceeds of his reign as Bonanno boss on the day of the verdict.

Immediately after his July 30 conviction, as court was adjourned, Massino requested a meeting with Judge Garaufis, where he made his first offer to cooperate. He did so in hopes of sparing his life; he was facing the death penalty if found guilty of Gerlando Sciascia's murder. Indeed, one of John Ashcroft's final acts as Attorney General was to order federal prosecutors to seek the death penalty for Massino. Massino thus stood to be the first Mafia boss to be executed for his crimes, and the first mob boss to face the death penalty since Lepke Buchalter was executed in 1944.

Massino subsequently claimed he decided to turn informer due to the prospect of his wife and mother having to forfeit their houses to the government. Mob authors and journalists Anthony D. DeStefano and Selwyn Raab both consider the turning of so many made men as a factor in disillusioning Massino with Cosa Nostra, the former also assuming Massino had decided to flip "long before the verdict". Massino was the first sitting boss of a New York crime family to turn state's evidence, and the second in the history of the American Mafia to do so (Philadelphia crime family boss Ralph Natale had flipped in 1999 when facing drug charges).

Basciano and Montagna's leadership 

In July 2004, federal prosecutors in Brooklyn claimed to have convicted 75 mobsters or associates of the Bonanno family in the four preceding years. In June 2005, 12 Bonanno family members and associates, seven over the age of 70, including acting consigliere Anthony Rabito, were indicted and arrested on charges of operating a $10 million a year gambling ring."

After the arrest of Massino, Vincent Basciano became acting boss. In 2006, Basciano was convicted in a racketeering trial for attempted murder and running an illegal gambling operation. However, due to a hung jury, Basciano was not convicted of the 2001 murder of Frank Santoro.

After Basciano's first murder trial, prosecutors retried him on those counts on which the jury hung in the first trial. On August 1, 2007, Basciano was convicted of murdering Santoro, who tried to kidnap Basciano's son, and was subsequently sentenced to life imprisonment. He named Brooklyn business owner Salvatore "Sal the Ironworker" Montagna as his "acting boss" during his trials. Montagna was closely associated with the Bonanno Sicilian faction, including Baldo Amato and capo Cesare Bonventre. Nicholas "Nicky Mouth" Santora served as "acting underboss" and Anthony Rabito as the alleged consigliere.

On February 6, 2007, acting underboss Nicholas Santora, acting consigliere Anthony Rabito, captains or former captains Jerome Asaro, Joseph Cammarano Jr. and Louis Decicco were indicted on racketeering charges.

Following the deportation of Montagna to Canada in 2009, he was succeeded by Vincent Badalamenti as Bonanno family acting boss.

Mancuso and acting boss Cammarano Jr.
In 2013, Michael Mancuso was named the new official boss of the Bonanno family, while serving time in prison. Mancuso's underboss Thomas DiFiore took over as acting boss in his absence, but was replaced by Joseph Cammarano, Jr in 2014 following DiFiore's arrest, guilty plea and 21-month prison sentence. In December 2016, the FBI observed over a dozen ranking members of the family host a dinner together in recognition of Cammarano Jr.'s new position.

Bonanno associate, Charles "Charlie Pepsi" Centaro, was sentenced to 33 months in prison on September 15, 2015, after being convicted of money laundering; it was alleged that he had laundered over $500,000. Centaro, along with Bonanno/Gambino associate Franco Lupoi were involved in a large cocaine, heroin and weapons trafficking operation that stretched from New York to Italy. The Gambino crime family from New York and the 'Ndrangheta Mafia from Calabria were also involved.

In November 2017, the FBI arrested several individuals in New York City, including members and associates of the Bonanno and Gambino crime families, on charges of narcotics trafficking, loansharking and firearms offenses. They included Damiano Zummo, a reputed acting captain in the Bonanno crime family. In November 2015, Zummo was involved in the induction ceremony of an undercover police agent, which was secretly recorded, in Canada. Zummo played a major role in the ceremony and named others at a higher level in the organization on the recording. A Brooklyn court official later said, "The recording of a secret induction ceremony is an extraordinary achievement for law enforcement and deals a significant blow to La Cosa Nostra." The recording also led to the arrest of 13 mobsters.

On January 12, 2018, eight members of the Bonanno family were arrested and charged with racketeering, extortion and related offenses. Street boss Joseph Cammarano Jr. and consigliere John "Porky" Zancocchio were included. Genovese and Lucchese crime family members Ernest Montevecchi and Eugene "Boopsie" Castelle were also arrested. The charges were assault and aid resulting in serious bodily injury, extortion, loansharking, wire and mail fraud, narcotics distribution, conspiracy to commit murder, extortion conspiracy, racketeering and racketeering conspiracy. Joseph "Joe Valet" Sabella was identified as a captain and George Tropiano as an acting capo. Made members Domenick Miniero, Albert "Al Muscles" Armetta and Joseph "Joey Blue Eyes" Santapaolo were charged with RICO and extortion conspiracy, Armetta was accused of assaulting a person on Halloween in 2015.

On August 15, 2018, Judge Dora Irizarry sentenced Ronald Giallanzo, nephew of Vincent Asaro and former Bonanno acting captain, to 14 years imprisonment. Giallanzo was previously arrested in March 2017 alongside Bonanno soldiers Michael Palmaccio and Nicholas Festa. Festa and Palmaccio admitted to the extortion of seven individuals and each paid $500,000 in forfeiture. Giallanzo was accused of operating a loansharking and illegal gambling business from 1998 to 2017. He agreed to pay $1.25 million in forfeiture and to sell his five-bedroom mansion in Howard Beach, Queens, which was constructed using the criminal proceeds of his loansharking business. He was ordered to pay $268,000 in restitution to his victims and admitted to his participation in extending and collecting extortionate loans from five individuals.

In October 2018, Sylvester Zottola ("Sally Daz"), age 71, an associate of the Bonanno family, was fatally shot at a McDonald's on Webster Avenue in the Bronx; authorities described the killing as a Mafia-style assassination. The killing occurred after several attacks targeting Zottola, and his son, Salvatore Zottola, over the preceding months. According to the court records, the elder Zottola had been a close associate of Vincent Basciano. In October 2018, federal prosecutors indicted Bushawn Shelton, allegedly a high-ranking member of the Bloods gang, with attempting to hire a hitman to kill Sylvester and Salvatore Zottola. In June 2019, federal prosecutors issued a superseding indictment, charging Anthony Zottola Sr. (the son of Sylvester Zottola and brother of Salvatore Zottola), Shelton, and six others with a murder-for-hire conspiracy and related charges. The charging document alleged that Anthony Zottola Sr. hired Shelton to arrange the hit, and that "Shelton in turn outsourced the job to several other members of the Bloods." The case is awaiting trial, with federal authorities possibly pursuing the death penalty.

On March 13, 2019, Cammarano Jr. and Zancocchio were acquitted of racketeering and conspiracy to commit extortion charges. On May 25, 2019, former family consigliere Anthony Graziano died.

Castellammarese connection 
In 2020, the Italian police together with the FBI discovered a strong link between the Bonannos and the Castellammare del Golfo Mafia family, in particular to Francesco Domingo. During the investigations, several meetings between Domingo and members of the Bonanno family were monitored. According to the reports, the Sicilian boss is considered the point of reference to the Bonannos' affiliates in Sicily. Most of the summits and meetings were held at Domingo's house in the Gagliardetta district, in Castellammare del Golfo.

Current position of the family 
As of 2022, Michael Mancuso remains the official boss of the Bonanno family. 

On March 9, 2022, boss Michael Mancuso was arrested and is under investigation for violating the terms of his supervised release by associating with members of organized crime. 

Vito Grimaldi, a former capo in the family and Joseph Cammarano Jr.'s father-in-law, died on July 15, 2022. Mancuso ordered Cammarano Jr. not to attend Grimaldi's wake on July 19, 2022, but he disobeyed Mancuso and went to the Glen Cove funeral home where the wake was being held anyway. There, some Bonanno mobsters confronted Cammarano Jr. as he approached Grimaldi's casket and assaulted him, knocking him to the ground, but he and his brother Dino, also present, were protected by a multitude of bikers from the Crazy Pistons Motorcycle Club in Brooklyn, who, along with the Cammaranos, got into a confrontation with the other mobsters. After the scuffle ended, Bonanno family capos Ernest "Ernie" Aiello and John "Johnny Mulberry" Sciremammano, as well as soldier John "Johnny Joe" Spirito Jr., were left bloodied and battered on the floor. When questioned about the incident, Mancuso's attorney Stacey Richman said "I categorically deny the allegation" with regards to Mancuso having ordered the assault on Cammarano Jr. A law enforcement source stated "It's hard to predict whether there will be retaliation, a violent reaction would have been a knee-jerk response a few decades ago, but the mob has stopped whacking people these days, but that is still a fear."

On August 16, 2022, two indictments out of the Eastern District of New York charged nine members and associates of the Bonanno and Genovese crime families with racketeering, illegal gambling, money laundering conspiracy, obstruction of justice, and other offenses. The Bonanno mobsters indicted included capo Anthony "Little Anthony" Pipitone, soldier Vito Pipitone, who was arrested in Wellington, Florida and appeared in federal court in Miami, associate Agostino Gabriele, and corrupt Nassau County Police Department detective Hector Rosario. The indictment alleged the Bonannos and Genoveses operated a joint illegal gambling establishment in Lynbrook called the Gran Caffe. The revenues from that operation were laundered through cash transfers to the defendants and then given to the family leaders. In addition, the two families controlled illegal gambling parlours at several other establishments, with the Bonanno family operating them at La Nazionale Soccer Club, the Glendale Sports Club and the Soccer Club at Rockaway Avenue, Valley Stream. Detective Rosario allegedly accepted bribes by the Bonanno family members in exchange for offering to arrange police raids of competing gambling locations. He was charged with obstructing a grand jury investigation and lying to the FBI, and subsequently suspended without pay from the Police Department.

Historical leadership

Boss (official and acting) 
1909–1912 – Sebastiano DiGaetano – stepped down
1912–1930 – Nicolo Schirò – fled
1930–1931 – Salvatore Maranzano – murdered on September 10, 1931
1931–1968 – Joseph "Joe Bananas" Bonanno – on October 21, 1964, Bonanno disappeared; forcibly replaced as boss by the commission; crime family split into two factions; in May 1966, Bonanno reappeared; officially retired after heart attack in 1968
Disputed 1964–1966 – Gaspar "Gasparino" DiGregorio – installed when Bonanno disappeared and later forcibly replaced by the Commission
Acting 1966–1968 – Paul Sciacca – for the DiGregorio faction
1968–1971 – Paul Sciacca – stepped down
1971–1973 – Natale "Joe Diamonds" Evola – died on August 28, 1973
1973–1991 – Phillip "Rusty" Rastelli – imprisoned 1975–1984 and 1986–1991
(unofficial) 1974–1979 – Carmine "Cigar" Galante – murdered on July 12, 1979
Acting 1979–1983 – Salvatore "Sally Fruits" Farrugia – appointed by the Commission
Acting 1987–1991 – Anthony "Old Man" Spero – sentenced to life imprisonment in 2002, died in 2008
1991–2004 – Joseph "Big Joey" Massino – imprisoned January 2003, became government informant in October 2004
Acting 1991–1993 – Anthony "Old Man" Spero
Acting 2003–2004 – Anthony "Tony Green" Urso – imprisoned January 2004
Acting 2004 – Vincent "Vinny Gorgeous" Basciano – became official boss
2004–2011 – Vincent "Vinny Gorgeous" Basciano – imprisoned November 2004, in July 2007 received a life sentence, stepped down
Acting 2004–2006 – Michael "The Nose" Mancuso – imprisoned February 2006
Acting 2006–2009 – Salvatore "Sal the Iron Worker" Montagna – deported to Canada in April 2009, shot and killed in November 2011
Acting 2010–2012 – Vincent "Vinny T.V." Badalamenti – imprisoned in January 2012
2013—present – Michael "The Nose" Mancuso – released from prison March 12, 2019
Acting 2013–2014 – Thomas "Tommy D" DiFiore – arrested on January 23, 2014
Acting 2014–2015 – John "Johnny Skyway" Palazzolo – arrested on March 27, 2015, for violating parole
Acting 2015–2019 – Joseph "Joe Saunders" Cammarano Jr. – indicted on racketeering and extortion charges on January 12, 2018, acquitted March 13, 2019

Street boss 
The Street boss is responsible for passing on orders to lower ranking members. In some instances a ruling panel (of capos) substituted the Street boss role. The family may choose to assemble a ruling panel of capos if the boss dies, goes to prison, or is incapacitated. During the 1960s family war, a ruling panel of capos controlled the decisionmaking for the family. In some instances the Acting boss uses a Street boss to divert law enforcement attention.

1964–1968 – Frank Labruzzo – led Bonanno faction
1964– Ruling panel – Gasparino DiGregorio, Angelo Caruso, Nicolino Alfano, Joseph Notaro, Thomas D'Angelo, Natale Evola, Joseph DeFilippo, Peter Crociata and Paul Sciacca
1964–1965 – Ruling panel – Gasparino DiGregorio, Angelo Caruso, and Nicolino Alfano
1977 – Ruling panel – Nicholas "Nicky Glasses" Marangello, Mickey Zaffarano and Stefano "Stevie Beefs" Cannone
2009–2010 – Ruling panel – Joseph Sammartino Sr. (capo in New Jersey), the other members are unknown
2010–2012 – Joseph "Joe Bosch" Bosco – worked with Vincent Badalamenti
2012–2013 – Ruling panel – Vincent Asaro, Anthony Rabito, and Thomas DiFiore
2014–2015 – John "Johnny Joe" Spirito Jr. – worked with John Palazzolo
2019–present – John "Johnny Skyway" Palazzolo

Underboss (official and acting) 
1915–1921 – Stefano Magaddino – fled to Buffalo
1921–1930 – Vito Bonventre – murdered on July 15, 1930
1930–1931 – Joseph Bonanno – became boss
1931–1932 – Angelo Caruso
1932–1955 – Francesco "Frank Caroll" Garofalo
1955–1962 – Giovanni Bonventre – fled to Sicily in 1950.
1962–1968 – Giovanni "Johnny Morales" Morale
Acting 1965–1968 – Pietro "Skinny Pete" Crociata – for the DiGregorio faction
Acting 1968 – Frank "Russo" Mari – for the DiGregorio faction, murdered
1968–1971 – Natale "Joe Diamonds" Evola – became boss
1971–1973 – Phillip "Rusty" Rastelli – became boss
1973–1979 – Nicholas "Nicky Glasses" Marangello (demoted)
1981–1991 – Joseph "Big Joe" Massino (imprisoned in 1984)
Acting 1984–1991 – Louis "Louie Ha Ha" Attanasio
1992–2003 – Salvatore "Handsome Sal" Vitale (became FBI informant in March 2003)
Acting 2001–2002 – Richard "Shellackhead" Cantarella (became an FBI informant in December 2002, and in June 2004 testified against Bonanno boss Joseph Massino.)
Acting 2003–2004 – Joseph "Joe C." Cammarano Sr.
Acting 2004 – Michael "The Nose" Mancuso – became acting boss
 2004–2007 – Nicholas "Nicky Mouth" Santora – Imprisoned in 2007
 2013–2015 – Thomas DiFiore  
Acting 2015 – Joseph Cammarano Jr.
 2015–2019 – Joseph Cammarano Jr. – indicted on January 12, 2018, acquitted March 13, 2019
 2019–present – Unknown

Consigliere (official and acting) 
c. 1930s – Frank Italiano
1932–1939 – Phillipe Rapa
1940–1964 – John Tartamella
1964–1968 – Salvatore "Bill" Bonanno
Acting 1965–1968 – Nicolino "Nick" Alfano – for the DiGregorio faction
Acting 1968 – Michael "Mike" Adamo
1968–1971 – Phillip "Rusty" Rastelli (promoted to underboss in 1971)
1971–1974 – Joseph DiFilippi
1974–1984 – Stefano "Stevie Beefs" Cannone
1984–2001 – Anthony Spero (acting boss from 1987 to 1993, died September 29, 2008)
Acting 1987–1992 – Joseph Buccellato
Acting 1999–2001 – Anthony "T.G." Graziano – became official consigliere
2001–2010 – Anthony "T.G." Graziano
Acting 2001–2003 – Anthony "Tony Green" Urso – became acting boss
Acting 2004–2007 – Anthony "Fat Tony" Rabito – imprisoned
2010–2015 – Anthony "Fat Tony" Rabito 
Acting 2012–2013 – Ernest "Ernie" Aiello
Acting 2013–2014 – Vincent "Vinny T.V." Badalamenti
Acting 2014–2015 – Simone Esposito
2015–2016 – Simone Esposito – was shelved and later indicted on January 12, 2018 
2016–2019 – John "Porky" Zancocchio – indicted on January 12, 2018, acquitted March 13, 2019
Acting 2017–2019 – Vincent "Vinny T.V." Badalamenti – served as the Mancuso faction Consigliere
 2019–present – Unknown

Current family members

Administration 
Boss – Michael "The Nose" Mancuso – current official boss of the Bonanno crime family. Before joining the Bonanno family, Mancuso was affiliated with the East Harlem Purple Gang. In August 1984, Mancuso shot and killed his wife, for which he received a 10-year prison sentence. He was arrested in Las Vegas on February 16, 2006, for ordering the murder of associate Randolph Pizzolo on November 30, 2004. On December 16, 2008, judge Nicholas Garaufis sentenced Mancuso to 15 years imprisonment for the Pizzolo murder. Mancuso was released on March 12, 2019. On March 9, 2022, Mancuso was arrested and is under investigation for violating the terms of his supervised release by associating with members of organized crime.
Street Boss – John "Johnny Skyway" Palazzolo – high-ranking member of the Bronx faction, Palazzolo was inducted into the family in 1977, alongside Frank Coppa Sr., Cesare Bonventre, and Baldassare "Baldo" Amato. In 2012, Palazzolo was released from prison after serving a 10-year sentence for attempted murder. In 2014, Palazzolo became acting boss for the then-imprisoned Michael Mancuso, but was arrested on March 27, 2015, for violating parole. He was observed meeting with consigliere Anthony "Fat Tony" Rabito and other Bonanno members. He was sentenced to serve a year and a day in prison and was released in 2016.
Underboss – Unknown
Consigliere – Unknown

Caporegimes 
Queens faction
Jerome "Jerry" Asaro – capo of the Howard Beach-Asaro crew. His father is Vincent Asaro. In 2014, Asaro was charged with exhuming the corpse of a gangland murder victim Paul Katz who was strangled with a dog chain by his father Vincent Asaro and James Burke. On June 15, 2020, Asaro was released from prison.

Anthony "Little Anthony" Pipitone – capo operating in Queens, Brooklyn and Long Island. On October 7, 2009, Pipitone was indicted along with capo Joseph Sammartino, capo Anthony Sclafani, acting capo Joseph Loiacono, soldiers Frank Pastore and Paul Spina among other members on racketeering charges. In June 2016, Pipitone was sentenced to two years in prison for violating his parole when he attended a Bonanno family Christmas party on Staten Island. Pipitone had served time in prison for stabbing two men, after they had broken windows of a mob-connected restaurant in Whitestone, Queens. On August 16, 2022, Pipitone was among nine men arrested, including his younger brother Vito, and charged with racketeering, money laundering, illegal gambling, conspiracy, obstruction of justice, and other charges. Members from the Bonnano as well as the Genovese families were arrested. The group used front businesses in Queens and Long Island to launder illegal profits. Pipitone was released on $2 million bond.

Brooklyn faction
Joseph "Joe Desi" DeSimone – capo operating from Brooklyn and Queens. In 1981, DeSimone was involved in the murder of his own capo Philip Giaccone and the murders of two other capos Dominick Trinchera and Alphonse Indelicato. In 2016, he was released from prison and violated supervised release and was sent back to prison. On November 10, 2017, he was released from prison. In May 2018, DeSimone and Genovese family capo John Brescio came under investigation for their involvement with Parx Casino.
Anthony "the Hat/Perry Como" Frascone – operating from Brooklyn and the Bronx who came up in the Dominick Trinchera crew. Frascone was involved in a large-scale illegal gambling operation along with Genovese soldier Victor Colletti. On November 30, 2011, Frascone was indicted with several members on charges stemming from the extortion of several Queens and Long Island strip clubs, who employed dancers who were not authorized to work in the US.

The Bronx faction
Ernest "Ernie" Aiello – capo operating from the Bronx. Aiello used to be an acting capo for Nicholas "Nicky Mouth" Santora along with Vito Badamo. In 2012, he and acting capo John "Johnny Joe" Spirito Jr., as well as 20 to 25 Bonanno mobsters stormed the Lucchese family-managed Coddington Club in the Bronx as a "show of force". The incident emerged after Lucchese family acting boss Matthew Madonna stated he did not recognize Michael Mancuso as the Bonanno family boss. On July 9, 2013, Aiello and eight other Bonanno family mobsters, including Santora and Badamo, were indicted on enterprise corruption, gambling, loan sharking, extortion and drug trafficking charges. The case ended in a mistrial on May 10, 2016. Along with capo John Sciremammano and soldier John Spirito Jr., Aiello stormed the Glen Cove funeral home where a service was held honoring former capo Vito Grimaldi. The trio assaulted former acting boss Joseph Cammarano Jr. and his brother Dino, alledgedly on the orders of Michael Mancuso.

Staten Island faction
(In prison) Joseph "Joe Valet" Sabella – capo operating from Staten Island and Brooklyn. In 2019, Sabella was sentenced to 87 months in prison for his involvement in the dumping of illegal material at the LNG site in Rossville, Staten Island. Sabella is currently imprisoned with a projected released date of October 23, 2025.

Long Island faction
John "Johnny Mulberry" Sciremammano – capo operating from Long Island. In June 2004, Sciremammano was arrested for running an illegal sports betting from Skybox Lounge, in Island Park and wiring the money to accounts in Costa Rica. Along with capo Ernest Aiello and soldier John Spirito Jr., Sciremammano stormed the Glen Cove funeral home where a service was held honoring former capo Vito Grimaldi. The trio assaulted former acting boss Joseph Cammarano Jr. and his brother Dino, alledgedly on the orders of Michael Mancuso.

New Jersey faction
Louis "Louie the Leg-Breaker" Civello Sr. – capo of the New Jersey crew. In 2015, Civello along with his son Louis Civello Jr. were under investigation due to their ownership of NJDAM and their involvement in car related fraud.

Soldiers 
Sandro Aiosa – a former capo in the 1970s who operated in Brooklyn. Aiosa was released from prison on October 12, 2012.
Albert "Al Muscles" Armetta – a soldier. Armetta is a former acting captain. Armetta was indicted in January 2018 for racketeering and assault. He was released from custody on February 12, 2020.
Vincent "Vinny" Asaro – former capo. During the 1990s, Asaro allegedly operated a multimillion-dollar stolen car ring and oversaw the hijacking of cargo at John F. Kennedy International Airport. In 1998 Asaro was convicted of running a car theft ring. In 2015, Asaro was acquitted of alleged involvement in the 1978 Lufthansa robbery with Lucchese crime family associates in which $21.3 million in today's money was reported stolen. In June 2017, Asaro was sentenced to eight years in prison for ordering the arson of a car that had cut him off in Howard Beach, Queens. He was granted compassionate release and was released on April 18, 2020, over fears of the COVID-19 outbreak.
 Louis "Louie Ha Ha" Attanasio – a former capo in the Bronx. Attanasio, along with his brother Robert "Bobby Ha Ha" and Peter Calabrese, murdered Bonanno family Sicilian faction member Cesare Bonventre in 1984. On September 20, 2006, Attanasio and Peter Calabrese were sentenced to 15 years in prison for the 1984 Bonventre murder. Attanasio's projected release date is January 23, 2018. His brother, only an associate of the Bonanno family, was sentenced to two years of supervised release and ordered to home confinement with GPS monitoring for the first six months by Senior United States District Judge Nicholas Garaufis. He was accused of affiliating with members of the Bonanno and Gambino crime families, including playing bocce with Louis Vallario, a capo of the Gambino crime family, which Attanasio pled guilty to. It was also revealed that Robert Attanasio was suffering from prostate cancer in 2017. He was released from prison on January 23, 2018.
Vincent "Vinny T.V." Badalamenti – former capo of the Bensonhurst crew. He served as the former acting boss and consigliere. In December 2009, Badalamenti was found with Staten Island-based capo Anthony Calabrese and soldier John "Johnny Green" Faracithe meeting at a Bensonhurst storefront. He served as acting boss from early 2010 until 2012 when he was imprisoned.
 Vito Badamo – former acting capo of Nicholas Santora's Graham Avenue, Williamsburg crew. In July 2013, Badamo was indicted, along with capo Nicholas Santora, acting capo Ernest Aiello, soldier Anthony Santoro and others, on racketeering, loansharking, illegal gambling and drug dealing charges. It was stated in court that Santora was training Badamo to take control of the crew in the future. In May 2016, Badamo and the others were released after their case ended in a mistrial. On May 18, 2017, Badamo was sentenced to three to seven years in prison on illegal gambling charges. The remaining members of his crew, Anthony Santoro, Dominick Siano, Nicholas Bernhard, Scott O'Neil, Anthony Urban and Richard Sinde, had all pled guilty of various crimes and were sentenced.
Anthony Calabrese – former acting capo based in Staten Island. He was found with capo Vincent Badalamenti in December 2009 meeting at a Bensonhurst storefront for a Christmas party.
Joseph "Joe Saunders" Cammarano Jr. – former street boss and acting underboss for the family. Cammarano Jr was a capo operating a crew in Brooklyn. After his father Joseph "Joe Saunders" Cammarano Sr., died on September 3, 2013, Cammarano Jr. took over his father's crew. Cammarano Jr. was indicted in January 2018 on racketeering and murder conspiracy charges along with John Zancocchio, effectively ending his reign as street boss. Cammarano Jr. was acquitted on March 13, 2019, and was reportedly shelved by Mancuso.
Michael Cassese – soldier. Cassese was one of numerous family members indicted on February 6, 2007. The family members, which included underboss Nicholas Santora and acting consigliere Anthony Rabito, were arraigned on charges of racketeering and other related crimes. Cassese was released from prison on May 22, 2014.
Salvatore "Toto" Catalano – a former capo and Street boss of the Sicilian faction. Catalano was heavily involved in the Pizza Connection a heroin drug distribution scheme with boss Carmine Galante. The heroin was shipped into the U.S. and sold through pizzerias in New York City and New Jersey. In 1976, Catalano became capo of the Knickerbocker Avenue Crew. On March 2, 1987, Catalano was sentenced to 45 years in prison and fined $1.15 million. He was released from prison on November 16, 2009.
John "Big John" Contello – former acting capo of the Indelicato-Chilli crew. Contello was a target of an August 28, 2008 indictment that charged him with racketeering, illegal gambling and conspiracy. In June 2009, he was sentenced to 31 to 37 months in prison.
Louis "Louie Electric" DeCicco – former capo in Brooklyn with operations in Queens and Long Island. In March 2007, DeCicco was arrested along with other Bonanno capos. On December 31, 2009, DeCicco was released from prison.
Thomas "Tommy D" DiFiore – a former acting boss and former capo. In 1979, DiFiore was thrown out of the Giaccone crew for getting into an argument with capo Philip Giaccone. By 1990, DiFiore had become a capo in the family and handled most of the actives on Long Island. In May 2000, DiFiore and two members of the Gambino crime family, capo Salvatore Scala and soldier Charles Carneglia, were arrested and charged with extortion. The FBI had recorded a mob sit-down on May 3, 2000, between DiFiore, Scala and Carneglia over who had the right to extort Cherry Video a sex shop on Long Island. On November 2, 2001, all three were sentenced to 63 months for extortion. DiFiore was released from prison on March 19, 2004. In 2013, he became the family underboss and acting boss for imprisoned boss Michael Mancuso. In January 2014, he was arrested on extortion charges along with Vincent Asaro. He was released from prison on August 4, 2015.
Vincent "Vinny Bionics" DiSario – soldier who was arrested in an August 28, 2008 indictment. DiSario was charged with racketeering, illegal gambling and racketeering conspiracy. In 2009, he pleaded guilty to a single count of collecting unlawful debts, and was sentenced to 18 to 24 months in prison.
 Thomas Fiore – former "acting capo" of Gerard Chilli's South Florida crew. He is based in the Palm Beach County city of Boynton Beach. On October 14, 2009, his crew in South Florida was charged under the RICO law. Six of the eleven crew members, including crew enforcer Pasquale Rubbo and his brother Joseph Rubbo, pled guilty to a list of crimes. The crew is involved in arson, insurance fraud, identity theft, illegal gambling and other crimes. They send some tribute to Bonanno family bosses in New York City. On March 2, 2010, Fiore was sentenced to twelve years for racketeering. Released from prison on October 23, 2019.
Anthony "Tony Black" Furino – former capo based in Staten Island. In 2004, Furino was arrested for extortion of Long Island night clubs and Staten Island restaurants. In 2007, Furino was released from prison.
Joseph Indelicato – a former capo in Manhattan and New Jersey. Took over crew from his deceased brother, Alphonse "Sonny Red" Indelicato. Joseph's nephew Anthony "Bruno" Indelicato is a soldier in the crew.
Joseph "Joe Lefty" Loiacono – former acting capo who was arrested on October 14, 2009, for running a loansharking operation. He was released on May 18, 2012.
Pasquale “Patty Boy” Maiorino – operating from the Bronx. Maiorino served 20 years for a 1981 murder and in 2015 was sent back to prison on a gun charge. In 2017, he was detained pending sentencing on a separate extortion charge associated with Genovese capo Pasquale Parrello of the Bronx.
Anthony "Anthony from Elmont" Mannone – (a.k.a. Anthony from the Five Towns) – former capo who was arrested on February 24, 2010, for running an illegal gambling and extortion ring throughout Brooklyn. Manone was released from prison on June 27, 2013
Vito Pipitone – soldier and younger brother of capo Anthony "Little Anthony" Pipitone. He was indicted on August 16, 2022 among other members of the Bonnano and Genovese families, and was charged with rackteering, illegal gambling, money laundering, and other charges.
Frank Porco – former capo operating from Staten Island, Brooklyn and Florida. In 2005, Porco was released from prison.
Salvatore Puccio – soldier based in Florida, Puccio was arrested along with capo Gerard "Jerry" Chili in February 2005. Charged with racketeering, conspiracy, money laundering, dealing with stolen property, and numerous illegal gambling-related crimes, Puccio was sentenced to 96 months in prison and was released on November 15, 2013.
Anthony "Fat Tony" Rabito – the former acting consigliere for Vincent Basciano prior to his incarceration and a longtime member of the Bonanno family. From January 2003 to July 2004, Rabito operated an illegal gambling and loansharking ring in Brooklyn, Queens, Manhattan, and Staten Island, earning $210,000 a week.
William "Willie Glasses" Riviello – a former capo operating in Manhattan, Brooklyn, Queens, Bronx and Westchester County. In 2004, Riviello was arrested for a stolen bank check scheme in the Bronx and Yonkers, New York, that grossed over $500,000 for the family. In 2007, Riviello was released from prison.
Frank "Frankie Boy" Salerno – in 2016, he was indicted with Gambino family acting Capo John "Johnny Boy" Ambrosio and Gambino family associate John Saladino on loan sharking and racketeering charges. Salerno was sentenced to 4 years in prison for helping collect loan shark debts.
Joseph "Sammy" Sammartino Sr. – a former capo of the New Jersey crew. He was born and raised in Jersey City's Marion Section and currently resides in North Arlington, New Jersey His crew is based in Bayonne, New Jersey and he controls a loansharking ring. In 2009, he served on a ruling panel running the family. On October 14, 2009, Sammartino was arrested on loansharking charges. He was sentenced to 18 months in prison and a $50,000 fine for extortion and loansharking. On January 27, 2011, Sammartino was released from prison.
Joseph "Joey Blue Eyes" Santapaolo – soldier in the family, Santapaolo was indicted on January 12, 2018, along with acting boss Joseph Cammarano Jr., consigliere John Zancocchio, and several other members and associates. 
Anthony "Scal" Sclafani – former capo based in Staten Island with illegal gambling operations. On October 7, 2009, Sclafani was indicted along with capo Joseph Sammartino, capo Anthony Pipitone, acting capo Joseph Loiacono, and soldiers Frank Pastore and Paul Spina, among other members, on racketeering and loansharking charges. It was revealed in the case that Sclafani had owed $50,000 to capo Joseph Sammartino. Sclafani tried to stay out of law enforcement surveillance by staying in his home all day. He controlled illegal gambling from a social club on Victory Blvd. that was named after a Staten Island youth league. Sclafani was released from prison on February 14, 2014.
Paul "Fat Paulie" Spina – soldier. Spina was one of numerous family members indicted on February 6, 2007. The family members, which included underboss Nicholas Santora and acting consigliere Anthony Rabito, were arraigned on charges of racketeering and other related crimes. Spina was released from prison on December 19, 2016.
John "Johnny Joe" Spirito Jr. – former Street Boss and Capo. He is the son of soldier John "Johnny Joe" Spirito Sr. and longtime member of the Bronx faction under former capo Patrick "Patty from the Bronx" DeFilippo. In 2003, Spirito Jr. along with Anthony Frascone were arrested on illegal gambling charges.
 George "Grumpy" Tropiano – former acting capo, Tropiano was indicted on January 12, 2018, along with acting boss Joseph Cammarano Jr., consigliere John Zancocchio, and several other members and associates. Tropiano was released from prison on January 13, 2022.
 Anthony "Tony Green" Urso – former capo and acting capo under Joseph Massino in the 1990s. In 2004, Urso was imprisoned for extortion and loansharking. Release from prison on June 25, 2021.
John "Porky" Zancocchio – former consigliere, Zancocchio was indicted in January 2018 on racketeering and murder conspiracy charges along with Joseph Cammarano Jr. Zancocchio was acquitted on March 13, 2019, and was reportedly shelved by Mancuso.

Imprisoned members 
 Anthony "Ace" Aiello – a soldier. In December 2008, he took a plea deal for the killing of a Bonanno family associate. Aiello was sentenced to 30-years imprisonment.
 Baldassare "Baldo" Amato – a soldier in the Sicilian faction and leader of a freelance crew operating in Ridgewood, Queens. He once served as a bodyguard to former boss Carmine Galante and was also with him on the day that he was murdered; it is alleged that he cooperated in Galante being murdered as his life was spared. As of 2006, Amato is currently serving a life sentence in federal prison for two murders and racketeering.
Fabrizio "The Herder" DeFrancisci – a soldier. DeFrancisci is a founding member of the Bonanno crew, the Bath Avenue Crew. DeFrancisci was sentenced to 50-years imprisonment for murder.
Gino Galestro – a former newspaper delivery truck driver and soldier who operated in Staten Island. He pled guilty to ordering the murder of associate Robert McKelvey over a debt in 2005. He will be released in 2023.
Ronald "Ronnie G" Giallanzo – former capo of the Howard Beach-Asaro crew. Giallanzo is the nephew of Vincent Asaro. In 2018, Giallanzo was sentenced to 14 years in prison for running a $3 million loansharking business. During the trial prosecutors stated that Giallanzo was capo of the Howard Beach crew between 1998 and 2017, even overseeing their operations while in prison for eight years.
 Anthony "Bruno" Indelicato – soldier in the crew of his uncle, Joseph Indelicato, and the son of Alphonse "Sonny Red" Indelicato. A made member since the late 1970s, Anthony Indelicato may have participated in the 1979 murder of Carmine Galante. Indelicato was a defendant in the 1986 Mafia Commission Trial, where he was sentenced to 45 years and released in 2000. On December 16, 2008, Indelicato received a 20-year prison sentence for the 2001 killing of Frank Santoro. Indelicato's projected release date is May 20, 2023.
 Stephen "Stevie Blue" Locurto – a soldier. In July 2006, he was given a life imprisonment sentence for racketeering and murder.
 Thomas Pitera – soldier and hitman who was sentenced to life in federal prison. He is currently serving his sentence in federal prison.

Past members
 Francesco "Frank" Bonomo – born in 1901 in Castellammare del Golfo, Sicily. He was a soldier for the Bonanno family by the late 1930s. Bonomo allegedly drove Mike Adamo and Frank Mari to a meeting they were both presumed murdered at in 1968 as a result of plotting to overthrow the leadership of Bonanno boss Paul Sciacca. Bonomo served as an acting capo during the late 1970s and Carmine Galante promoted him to official captain before his murder. He died in 1987.
 Cesare "The Tall Guy" Bonventre – a former capo and member of the Sicilian faction. He was related to Vito Bonventre, John Bonventre, and Joseph Bonanno. He was murdered on April 16, 1984.
 John "Boobie" Cerasani – was a Bonanno family soldier and right-hand man to Sonny "Black" Napolitano. Cerasani was involved in the 1981 murders of three warring captains Alphonse Indelicato, Dominick Trinchera and Philip Giaccone. On July 26, 1982, Cerasani, Benjamin "Lefty" Ruggiero, Anthony Rabito, Nicholas Santora and Antonio Tomasulo were tried in Manhattan federal district court. Cerasani was later acquitted.
 Gerard "Gerry" Chilli – capo who controlled a crew in Staten Island, Chilli controlled the family's Florida operations in Broward County, from his Hollywood home with his nephew Thomas Fiore, who is still currently an active member. He died September 10, 2016.
 James "Jimmy Legs" Episcopia – a soldier who worked for capo Sonny "Black" Napolitano.
 Vito Grimaldi – former capo of Bushwick-Ridgewood crew. He operates illegal Poker machines in Ridgewood, Queens from cafes and pizzerias. In 2002, he was arrested on illegal gambling and racketeering charges; he later pled guilty and was sentenced to two years in prison. Grimaldi owns a Bakery in Ridgewood, Queens. His son Joseph Grimaldi is also a made man in the Bonanno family. His son-in-law is former acting boss Joseph Cammarano Jr. Along with his son, Grimaldi was temporarily shelved in 2019 following the acquittal of Joseph Cammarano Jr. and John Zancocchio. Grimaldi died on July 15, 2022.
 Domenick Miniero – soldier in the family, Miniero was indicted on January 12, 2018, along with acting boss Joseph Cammarano Jr., consigliere John Zancocchio, and several other members and associates. Miniero died on November 8, 2019.
 Salvatore "Sal the Iron Worker" Montagna – capo and acting boss after the 2005 conviction of Vincent Basciano. Based in the Bronx, Montagna was reportedly the leader of the Sicilian faction. Montagna was born in Montreal, Quebec, Canada and resided in Elmont, New York. His family originated from Castellammare del Golfo, Sicily. On April 21, 2009, Montagna was deported to Canada and he settled in Montreal. In Montreal, Montagna tried to assume control of the Rizzuto crime family while its leader, Vito Rizzuto, was imprisoned in the United States. Montagna was assassinated on November 24, 2011, outside of Montreal, his body was found near Repentigny, Quebec, in the Assomption River, on Île Vaudry, having been shot at around 10 am.
 Gerlando "George from Canada" Sciascia – a former capo who worked with the Sicilian faction in New York. Sciascia served as mediator between Bonanno family and Montreal's Rizzuto family in the 1990s. He was murdered on March 18, 1999.
 Michael Zaffarano – a former capo who was involved in the adult entertainment industry. Anthony Mirra, a soldier in his crew, was responsible for allowing FBI agent Joseph D. Pistone ("Donnie Brasco") to work undercover in the Bonanno crime family. On February 14, 1980, Zaffarano died from a heart attack during an FBI raid.

List of Casualties of the "Banana War"  
{| border="1" class="wikitable"
|-
| Name || Date || Reason 
|-
| Carlo Simari || October 21, 1964 || Simari is shot to death outside his Brooklyn home by a DiGregorio gunman.
|-
| Joe Badalamonte || February 10, 1965 || DiGregorio faction soldier is shot to death in Brooklyn.
|-
| John "Johnny Futto" Biello || March 17, 1967 || Biello, a Genovese crime family captain, was killed on orders of boss Joseph Bonanno after Biello revealed to the Commission Joseph Bonanno's plans to take over the Commission and murder Bonanno family members during the war and within the Commission takeover if necessary. Biello is found shot to death in Miami.
|-
| Vince "Jimmy Lefty" Cassese & Vince "Vinnie Carroll" Garofalo || October 25, 1967 || Both were Bonanno loyalists and are found shot to death in Brooklyn.
|-During Bonanno's two-year absence, Gaspar DiGregorio took advantage of family discontent over Bill's role to claim family leadership. The Mafia Commission named DiGregorio as Bonanno family boss and the DiGregorio revolt led to four years of strife in the Bonanno family, labeled by the media as the "Banana War". This led to a divide in the family between loyalists to Bill and loyalists to DiGregorio.
|-
| Gaetano "Smitty" D'Angelo, James "Jimmy D" D'Angelo & Frank "Frankie 500" Telleri || November 10, 1967 || DiGregorio faction captain's are killed by a machine gun inside the Cypress Gardens restaurant in Ridgewood, Queens.
|-
| Pietro "Skinny Pete" Crociata || March 4, 1968 || DiGregorio faction underboss. Crociata is shot while getting out of his car in Manhattan and turns to retirement from the crime family.
|-
| Salvatore "Big Hank" Perrone || March 11, 1968 || Perrone was a bodyguard to Bill Bonanno, the son of Joseph Bonanno. Perrone is shot to death on a street in Brooklyn.
|-
| Mike "Bruno" Consolo || April 1, 1968 || DiGregorio faction soldier is shot and killed after a court appearance while getting into his car in Brooklyn.
|-
| Billy Gonzales || April 5, 1968 || Bonanno faction associate is shot to death outside his home in the Bronx.
|-
| Francisco "Frank Coffee" Crociata || April 17, 1968 || DiGregorio faction soldier Crociata is shot and wounded in Brooklyn.
|-
| Frank "Frankie T" Mari & Michael "Mikey Adams" Adamo || September 18, 1968 || DiGregorio underboss Mari and consigliere Adamo are considered dead after their disappearance from Brooklyn in late-1968
|-
| Tommy Zummo || February 6, 1969 || future boss Joseph Massino shoots and kills Zummo in Queens.
|-
|}

 Family crews 
 Knickerbocker Ave Zips, also known as the Sicilian faction – operating from Bushwick, Brooklyn and Queens neighborhoods of Ridgewood, Glendale, Middle Village and Maspeth.  In the 1950s the Bonanno family started bringing Sicilian-born Mafia members to New York to keep closer ties with the Sicilian Mafia families. American mobsters frequently refer to these Sicilian mobsters as Zips. The derogatory term name derives from their Sicilian birth and their fast-spoken, difficult-to-understand Sicilian dialects. In the late 1960s, Salvatore Catalano controlled the Sicilian Zips running the family's heroin racket with Carmine Galante. Members of the Zip crew were two of Galante's most trusted bodyguards, cousins Cesare Bonventre and Baldo Amato.
The Motion Lounge crew – formerly run by capo Nicholas "Nicky Mouth" Santora until his death in 2018. This Brooklyn-based crew is active primarily in the Western Brooklyn communities of Williamsburg and East Williamsburg.
 The Indelicato crew – run by capo Joseph Indelicato. This crew is active in Manhattan and New Jersey. Indelicato's nephew Anthony "Bruno" Indelicato is a soldier in this crew.
 Bath Avenue crew – a "farm team" that was run by Bonanno associate Paul Gulino supervised under consigliere Anthony Spero until Gulino got into an argument with Spero and shoved him. Spero then ordered Gulino's death and Gulino was murdered by two members of Gulino's own Bath Avenue crew, Joey Calco and Tommy Reynolds (Calco actually pulled the trigger). Fabrizio Defrancisci is the only one of the crew's former members that became a made man in the Bonanno family.
 Arizona Crew – operating out of Tucson, Arizona, little information is known about the Arizona Crew formerly led by Salvatore Bonanno. It is highly likely that it is defunct.

 The Bonannos and the Canadian factions

In 1953, boss Joseph Bonanno sent Carmine Galante to Montreal, Quebec, Canada, to supervise the family drug business there, where he worked with the Calabrian Vincenzo Cotroni of the Cotroni crime family in the French Connection. Police also estimated that Galante was collecting gambling profits in Montreal worth about $50 million per year. In April 1956, due to Galante's strong-arm extortion tactics, the Canadian Government deported him back to the United States. Rizzuto was an underling in the Sicilian faction, led by Luigi Greco until his death in 1972. As tension then grew into a power struggle between the Calabrian and Sicilian factions of the family, a mob war began in 1973.Manning, George A, PH.D Financial Investigation and Forensic Accounting pg.214–215 Capodecina Paolo Violi complained about the independent modus operandi of his Sicilian 'underlings', Nicolo Rizzuto in particular. In 1977, Rizzuto and Violi met face-to-face in the home of a Montreal resident for a last-ditch effort to resolve their differences, according to a police report. But the peace talks failed, and most of the Rizzuto family fled to Venezuela. The Sicilians killed Violi in 1978, his brothers, and others. With the death of Vincenzo Controni in 1984, from natural causes, the Rizzuto crime family became the most powerful Mafia family in Montreal. The FBI considers both the Cotronis and the Rizzutos to be connected to the Bonanno crime family, but Canadian law enforcement considers them to be separate. The Rizzuto family is sometimes referred to as the Sixth Family. In 1988, Nicolo Rizzuto was convicted of cocaine trafficking and his son Vito Rizzuto became boss of the family. Vito Rizzuto was arrested in January 2004, and extradited to the United States on murder charges in August 2006. In May 2007, Rizzuto accepted a plea deal for his involvement in the May 1981 murders of three renegade Bonanno capos in New York, and was sentenced to 10 years in prison. During his time in prison, his son Nicolo Rizzuto Jr. was murdered on December 28, 2009, while his father Nicolo Rizzuto Sr. was murdered on November 10, 2010.Nicolo Rizzuto assasiné (Radio-Canada)  He was released from prison on October 5, 2012, and subsequently died on December 23, 2013, from complications of lung cancer.

 Government informants and witnesses 
 William Joseph Dara – he is the first confirmed Bonanno informant. He was born on July 12, 1905, in Sicily, and immigrated to the United States in 1910. Dara was active in the Florida and Miami area. He became a soldier in the Bonanno crime family around 1949 or 1950. Dara became an informer and decided to cooperate in late 1967, two days after he was sentenced to seven and a half years in prison for attempting to extort $250,000 from a Miami-based trucking company owner. It is noted by the FBI that in 1968, alongside Bonanno capo Michael Sabella, he and Dara met with Lucchese crime family capo Paul Vario and acting boss Ettore Coco in Miami in order to keep the peace between the two crime families. He died on July 9, 1982, in a plane crash in Louisiana.
 Joseph Calco – former associate with the Bath Avenue crew, a follower and subgroup of the Bonanno crime family. He was the triggerman in the hit on childhood friend and Bath Avenue crew leader Paul Gulino on July 25, 1993. In 2001, Calco became a government witness and testified against Bonanno consigliere Anthony Spero. Calco then entered the Witness Protection Program under the name "Joseph Milano". While working at a pizzeria he owned in Florida, Calco assaulted and pistol whipped a customer who complained about his calzone order in 2009, and his true identity became public knowledge; he was sentenced to six months in prison in November 2011.
 Michael "Mikey Y" Yammine – former associate with the Bath Avenue crew. In 2001, Yammine became a government informant. Alongside fellow Bath Avenue crew member and government witness Joseph Calco, he testified in March 2001 against the former Bonanno family consigliere, Anthony "Old Man" Spero.
 Vincenzo Morena – former soldier who was active with the Bonanno-Giannini crew in Queens. He was sentenced to over four years imprisonment in 2001. Morena was secretly an informer since at least the early 2000s. He was part of the November 2015 law enforcement operation which targeted the Bonanno and Gambino families, and which oversaw an employed law enforcement agent secretly become an American Mafia member for the first time in history, Morena himself was inducted and the ceremony was recorded.Frank Coppa Sr. – former capo and close friend of Joseph Massino. He was inducted into the Bonanno crime family in mid-1977 by Carmine Galante in Brooklyn. It is noted that he was initiated alongside John Palazzolo, however Cesare Bonventre and Baldo Amato were initiated during the same night. In 1978, he survived a car bombing. Coppa was known for his involvement in fraud and stock scams. He became a government witness in November 2002.
 Salvatore "Handsome Sal" Vitale – former underboss. In January 2003, Vitale was charged with the 1992 murder of Bonanno associate Robert Perrino. In April 2003, Vitale became a government informant. In July 2004, he testified at the trial of his brother-in-law, boss Joseph Massino. By 2010, Vitale had testified against 51 organized crime figures.
 James "Big Louie" Tartaglione – former capo. In 2003, Tartaglione began wearing a wire and recorded conversations with other Bonanno family members. In 2007, Tartaglione testified against Vincent Basciano and Patrick DeFilippo.
 Joseph "Joey Moak" D'Amico – former soldier. D'Amico was inducted into the Bonanno crime family in 1977 at Elizabeth Street, Little Italy. He served in the crew of his uncle, Bonanno capo Alfred "Al Walker" Embarrato. He was also an acquaintance of Sicilian hitman and Bonanno capo Cesare Bonventre, who can be seen together in several FBI surveillance photos. D'Amico murdered Anthony Mirra, his cousin and a Bonanno capo, on February 18, 1982, on orders of boss Joseph Massino as Mirra had allowed FBI agent Joseph Pistone, better known as Donnie Brasco, to infiltrate the family. Between January and March 2003, D'Amico decided to become a government informant.
 Frank "Curly" Lino – former capo. Lino became an informer in 2003 and testified at the trial for the 1981 murders of Bonanno capos Alphonse Indelicato, Philip Giaccone, and Dominick Trinchera. Lino then testified on the 1981 murder of Dominick Napolitano. Napolitano was killed by Bonanno family member Robert Lino Sr. (his cousin) and Ronald Filocomo.
 Duane "Goldie" Leisenheimer – a family associate and ally to Joseph Massino since the age of twelve. He joined the Massino hijacking crew and helped hide Massino in the 1980s. Leisenheimer was the lookout for the 1981 murder of three captains. In 2004, with Salvatore Vitale testifying against him, Leisenheimer turned informant against Massino.
 Joseph "Big Joe" Massino – former boss from the early 1990s until 2004. He was active since 1960 through his introduction by Salvatore Vitale, brother-in-law and future Bonanno underboss. He became a soldier during the late 1970s. Massino became the first official boss from New York to become an informant. While boss, Massino changed the Bonanno family from being the weakest family in New York City to one of the most powerful in the country. He teamed up with Gambino family boss John Gotti to reinstate the Bonanno family on the Mafia Commission, after the family was kicked off as a result of allowing FBI agent Joseph Pistone aka Donnie Brasco to meet former Florida crime family boss Santo Trafficante and several high-ranking members of the Bonanno organization. In the early 2000s, Massino was the strongest and most influential boss not in prison. In January 2003, Massino was charged with the 1981 murder of Bonanno capo Dominick Napolitano. Massino had Napolitano killed for admitting FBI agent Joseph D. Pistone (known as Donnie Brasco) to his crew. At his 2004 trial, over 70 witnesses testified against him and accused him of participating in four murders. Former U.S. Attorney General John Ashcroft accused him of ordering the murder of Bonanno capo and major heroin trafficker Gerlando Sciascia in 1999. In addition, he was suspected of participating in the murders of Bonanno capos Anthony Mirra in 1982 and also Sicilian hitman Cesare Bonventre in 1984, and hitman Gabriel Infanti. In 2004, Massino turned informant and testified against members of his own family to avoid the death penalty. In January 2005, Massino wore a wire to record conversations in prison with his acting boss Vincent Basciano.
 Michael "Sonny" Maggio – former soldier. He led an unofficial crew within the Bonanno family with Gino Galestro. It is noted that Maggio has ordered at least two murder contracts, including Robert McKelvey, a Bonanno associate who was stabbed and then drowned outside of the Kreischer Mansion in April 2005; the corpse was later dismembered and incinerated. Maggio was sentenced to six years imprisonment in 2005 and released in 2011; he expressed during his imprisonment that he enjoyed painting pictures and sending them to his children, however he was uncertain if his children received the paintings due to his sister's marriage to Galestro.
 Peter Rosa – former soldier. He allegedly committed the 1989 murder of Gerald Guarino. Rosa became a government informer by at least 2006.
 Dominick Cicale – former capo and associate of Vincent "Vinny Gorgeous" Basciano. He was suspected of participating in at least two murders, including the 2004 murder of Bonanno associate Randy Pizzolo. Before joining the Bonanno family, he murdered a drug dealer in Florida and served 11 years in prison. In 2007, Cicale became a government witness and testified against Basciano. He was released in 2013 after serving eight years in prison. In 2014, he asked Judge Richard J. Sullivan to show leniency towards Joseph Basciano, the son of former Bonanno acting boss Vincent Basciano, who had been convicted of selling marijuana; Sullivan had sentenced Basciano to six months in prison.
 Nicholas "P.J." Pisciotti – former acting capo. In 2007, Pisciotti assaulted several Genovese crime family associates in a Little Italy restaurant. When Piscotti learned that Bonanno mobsters Nicholas Santora and Anthony Rabito had given the Genovese family permission to kill him, Pisciotti became a government witness. In 2007, he testified against Vincent Basciano.
 Generoso "Jimmy the General" Barbieri – former soldier and acting capo. He became a government witness in 2011 and testified against Vincent Basciano, twice. Along with former boss Joseph Massino, he revealed Basciano's plot to murder Greg Andres, an attorney. He pled guilty to murder, racketeering, illegal gambling and loansharking, and was sentenced to time already served in 2013.
 Peter "Pug" Lovaglio – former soldier and capo based in Staten Island. In 2013, he pled guilty to three parole violations. He agreed to cooperate in 2015 after a serious assault inside of a sushi bar, he was sentenced to eight years in prison in March 2017 for the crime. In January 2018, Lovaglio testified against Philadelphia crime family boss Joey Merlino and recounted befriending Merlino in 2015.Eugene "Gene" Borrello - former associate, Borrello was arrested in 2014 for leading a violent Bonnano-associated home invasion ring in Howard Beach, Queens. While in custody, Borrello agreed to turn state's evidence in early 2016, testifying against several family members, including Vincent Asaro. In 2019, Borrello was sentenced to time served and released, where he became an author and started a podcast with John Alite. In February 2021, he was arrested for making violent threats towards an ex-girlfriend and her family.
 Thomas "Sharkey" Carrube' – former soldier. In 1992, Carrube and James Galante were indicted for racketeering and bribery while working as foremen at the Metropolitan News Company. Carrube was inducted into the Bonanno family in 2014 in order to seek protection from Peter Lovaglio. Carrube declined a business proposal from Lovaglio, and was offered membership from then-consigliere Simone Esposito. During the dispute in family leadership between Mancuso and Cammanaro, Carrube witnessed most of the tension. In 2017, Carrube was approached by authorities and agreed to become an informant, taping conversations between family members.

 Hearings 

 References 

 Notes 

 Sources 
DeStefano, Anthony. King of the Godfathers: Joseph Massino and the Fall of the Bonanno Crime Family. New York: Pinnacle Books, 2006. 

 Further reading 
Bonanno, Bill. Pistone, Joseph. (2008). "The Good Guys."
Bonanno, Bill (1999). "Bound by Honor: A Mafioso's Story." New York: St Martin's Paperbacks
Bonanno, Joe (1983). A Man of Honor: The Autobiography of Joseph Bonanno. New York: St Martin's Paperbacks. 
Talese, Gay (1971). Honor Thy Father. Cleveland: World Publishing Company. 
Pistone, Joseph D.; & Woodley, Richard (1999) Donnie Brasco: My Undercover Life in the Mafia, Hodder & Stoughton. .
Pistone, Joseph D. (2004). The Way of the Wiseguy, Running Press. .
Pistone, Joseph D.; & Brandt, Charles (2007). Donnie Brasco: Unfinished Business, Running Press. .
Alexander, Shana. The Pizza Connection: Lawyers, Drugs, Money, Mafia. New York: Weidenfeld & Nicolson, 1988.
Blumenthal, Ralph. Last Days of the Sicilians. New York: Simon & Schuster (Pocket Books), 1988.
Sterling, Claire. Octopus: How the Long Reach of the Sicilian Mafia Controls The global Narcotics Trade. New York: Simon & Schuster (Touchstone), 1990.
Stille, Alexander. Excellent Cadavers: The Mafia & the Death of the First Italian Republic. New York: Random House, 1995.
Nicaso, Antonio & Lamothe, Lee. Bloodlines: The Rise & Fall of the Mafia's Royal Family. Canada: HarperCollins, 2001.
Raab, Selwyn. The Five Families: The Rise, Decline & Resurgence of America's Most Powerful Mafia Empire. New York: St. Martins Press, 2005.
Edwards, Peter. The Northern Connection: Inside Canada's Deadliest Mafia Family. Canada: Optimum International, 2006.
Humphreys, Adrian & Lamothe, Lee. The Sixth Family: The Collapse of the New York Mafia & the Rise of Vito Rizzuto. Canada: Wiley, 2006.
Crittle, Simon. The Last Godfather: The Rise & Fall of Joey Massino. New York: Berkley Books, 2006.
DeStefano, Anthony. The Last Godfather: Joey Massino & the Fall of the Bonanno Crime Family''. California: Citadel, 2006.

External links 
Bonanno crime family – New York Times
Dieland: Bonanno crime family "American Zips"
 Press release on the 2004 indictment of Vincent Basciano on racketeering charges
 Acting boss Michael Mancuso arrested on 2004 murder charge, February 17, 2006 

 
Organizations established in the 1890s
1890s establishments in New York (state)
Organizations based in New York City
Five Families
Gangs in Florida
Gangs in New Jersey
Gangs in New York City